Steindolpbreen  is a glacier in Nathorst Land at Spitsbergen, Svalbard. It extends from Juvtinden and the eastern side of Steindolptoppen to Snøkuvbreen. North of the glacier are the mountains of Rånekampen and Vengefjellet.

References

Glaciers of Spitsbergen